Amiantofusus borbonica is a species of sea snail, a marine gastropod mollusc in the family Fasciolariidae, the spindle snails, the tulip snails and their allies.

Description

Distribution

References

External links
 raussen K., Kantor Y. & Hadorn R. 2007. Amiantofusus gen. nov. for Fusus amiantus Dall, 1889 (Mollusca: Gastropoda: Fasciolariidae) with description of a new and extensive Indo-West Pacific radiation. Novapex 8 (3–4): 79–101

Fasciolariidae
Gastropods described in 2007